The men's artistic team all-around gymnastics event at the 2017 Summer Universiade from August 19 to 20 at the Taipei Nangang Exhibition Center, Hall 1, 4F in Taipei, Taiwan.

Final results

References

External links
2017 Summer Universiade – Artistic gymnastics

Men's artistic team all-around